General Stopford may refer to:

Edward Stopford (British Army officer) (1766–1837), British Army lieutenant general
Frederick Stopford (1854–1929), British Army lieutenant general
Montagu Stopford (1892–1971), British Army general